A variety of Polish flags are defined in current Polish national law, either through an act of parliament or a ministerial ordinance. Apart from the national flag, these are mostly military flags, used by one or all branches of the Polish Armed Forces, especially the Polish Navy. Other flags are flown by vessels of non-military uniformed services.

Most Polish flags feature white and red, the national colors of Poland. The national colors, officially adopted in 1831, are of heraldic origin and derive from the tinctures of the coats of arms of Poland and Lithuania. Additionally, some flags incorporate the white eagle of the Polish coat of arms, while other flags used by the Armed Forces incorporate military eagles, which are variants.

Both variants of the national flag of Poland were officially adopted in 1919, shortly after Poland re-emerged as an independent state in the aftermath of World War I in 1918. Many Polish flags were adopted within the following three years.
The designs of most of these flags have been modified only to adjust to the changes in the official rendering of the national coat of arms. Major modifications included a change in the stylization of the eagle from Neoclassicist to Baroque in 1927 and the removal of the crown from the eagle's head during the Communist rule from 1944 to 1990. Legal specification for the shades of the national colors has also changed with time. The shade of red was first legally specified as vermilion by a presidential decree of 13 December 1928.
This verbal prescription was replaced with coordinates in the CIE 1976 color space by the Coat of Arms Act of 31 January 1980.

National flags 

The basic variant of the national flag is a plain white-and-red horizontal bicolor. A variant defaced with the coat of arms is restricted to official use abroad and at sea. Legal restrictions notwithstanding, the two variants are often treated as interchangeable in practice.

Military flags

Rank flags used in all branches of the Armed Forces
Originally used only by the Navy, the use of these rank flags was extended in 2005 to all branches of the Armed Forces by an amendment to the relevant ministerial ordinance. They are flown to mark the presence and pay respect to the highest civilian and military authorities: the President of the Republic of Poland who is ex officio commander-in-chief of the Armed Forces; the Minister of National Defence who acts on the commander-in-chief's behalf in peacetime; Marshal of Poland, the highest rank in the Polish army (no living holders since 1989); and the Chief of the General Staff.

Navy 

The war ensign and the naval jack symbolize traditions of the Polish Navy dating back to Polish privateer fleet of the 15th–17th centuries.
They are also symbols of a navy ship crew's courage, honor, unbreakable fighting spirit and readiness to defend Poland and its maritime rights. Naval Service Regulations define when, where and how the flags should be raised and lowered on board a navy ship.

Rank flags

Rank pennants

Air Force

Other branches of the Armed Forces

Flags of the commanders of the units of the Ministry of National Defence

Flags of other uniformed services

Naval flags

Special state service vessels 
Special state service flags are used by state-employed civil special-purpose ships while on duty. These flags all follow the same basic design; a white flag with a horizontal stripe whose width is 1/5 of the flag's width. In the middle, each flag is emblazoned with the national coat of arms superimposed on a golden or yellow anchor whose height is 3/5 of the flag's width. The middle stripe is broken in the middle and does not touch the anchor or the arms. The type of special service performed by the ship is indicated by the color of the middle stripe.

Subdivisions flags

Current voivodeship flags

Historical voivodeship flags

Historical flags

Political flags

Organizations flags

Religious flags

Ethnic groups flags

Regional flags

House flags

See also 
 Flag terminology
 Coat of arms of Poland
 Mazurek Dąbrowskiego

References

External links 

Poland